Alzheimer is a 2011 Iranian drama film directed by Ahmad Reza Motamedi.

Cast
 Faramarz Gharibian as Naeem
 Mehdi Hashemi as Amir Ghasem
 Mahtab Keramati as Assiyeh
 Mehran Ahmadi
 Hamid Ebrahimi as Sarkar
 Hoda Nasseh
 Davood Fathali Baygi as Rohani
 Sufia Dezhakam

References

External links
 

2011 films
2011 drama films
2010s Persian-language films
Iranian drama films